Kollwitz may refer to:

Käthe Kollwitz (1867–1945), German artist 
Käthe Kollwitz House (Moritzburg), a museum 
Käthe Kollwitz Museum (Berlin)
Käthe Kollwitz Museum (Cologne)
Käthe Kollwitz Prize

Others
Kollwitz (band), Norwegian post-punk/metal band 
8827 Kollwitz, main-belt asteroid